MTV Unplugged is a 1993 live album and video by American alternative rock band 10,000 Maniacs, recorded for the MTV Unplugged series. The album was certified triple platinum by the Recording Industry Association of America and spawned the hit single "Because the Night", a cover of the song written by Patti Smith and Bruce Springsteen. Between the recording and release of the album, vocalist Natalie Merchant left the band to pursue a solo career.

Outtakes
Many songs were recorded during the performance that were not included on the album. These included four takes of "How You've Grown" and a brief take of "Puff the Magic Dragon". In addition, three songs were performed with David Byrne as a guest singer: two takes of "Let the Mystery Be" (one of which was released as a B-side to "Few and Far Between" and reissued on Campfire Songs: The Popular, Obscure and Unknown Recordings of 10,000 Maniacs), Dolly Parton's "Jolene" and "Dallas".

Reception

The album debuted at its No. 13 peak and spent 45 weeks on the Billboard charts. In December 1997, it was certified 3× Platinum by the RIAA.

The single release "Because the Night" reached No. 11 on the Billboard Hot 100 chart, two positions higher than Patti Smith's original version in 1978. It remains the band's biggest hit.

Track listing
Cassette/CD
"These Are Days" (Rob Buck, Natalie Merchant) – 4:22
"Eat for Two" (Merchant) – 4:12
"Candy Everybody Wants" (Dennis Drew, Merchant) – 3:19
"I'm Not the Man" (Merchant) – 3:46
"Don't Talk" (Drew, Merchant) – 5:22
"Hey Jack Kerouac" (Buck, Merchant) – 3:29
"What's the Matter Here?" (Buck, Merchant) – 4:50
"Gold Rush Brides" (Buck, Merchant) – 4:12
"Like the Weather" (Merchant) – 4:15
"Trouble Me" (Drew, Merchant) – 3:40
"Jezebel" (Merchant) – 4:20
"Because the Night" (Bruce Springsteen, Patti Smith) – 3:44
"Stockton Gala Days" (Jerome Augustyniak, Buck, Drew, Steve Gustafson, Merchant) – 5:25
"Noah's Dove" (Merchant) – 5:07

LaserDisc/VHS
"Noah's Dove" (Merchant)
"These Are Days" (Buck, Merchant)
"Eat for Two" (Merchant)
"Candy Everybody Wants" (Drew, Merchant)
"I'm Not the Man" (Merchant)
"Don't Talk" (Drew, Merchant)
"Hey Jack Kerouac" (Buck, Merchant)
"What's the Matter Here?" (Buck, Merchant)
"Gold Rush Brides" (Buck, Merchant)
"Like the Weather" (Merchant)
"Trouble Me" (Drew, Merchant)
"Jezebel" (Merchant)
"Stockton Gala Days" (Augustyniak, Buck, Drew, Gustafson, Merchant)
"Because the Night" (Springsteen, Smith)
"Let the Mystery Be" (Iris DeMent) (with David Byrne) 
"Jolene" (Dolly Parton) (with David Byrne) 
"Dallas" (Jimmie Dale Gilmore) (with David Byrne) / End Credits

During the introduction to "Hey Jack Kerouac", Merchant reads a passage from On the Road by Jack Kerouac. During the introduction to "Gold Rush Brides", she reads a passage from Women's Diaries of the Westward Journey by Lillian Schlissel.

Personnel

10,000 Maniacs
Natalie Merchant – lead vocals, piano
Jerome Augustyniak – drums, percussion
Rob Buck – acoustic guitar
Dennis Drew – piano, Hammond organ, pump organ
Steven Gustafson – acoustic bass guitar

Additional musicians
Bill Dillon – acoustic guitar, mandolin, slide guitar
Amanda Kramer – piano, pump organ
Jerry Marotta – percussion
Morgan Fichter – violin, background vocals
Mary Ramsey – viola, background vocals
Jane Scarpantoni – cello
Richie Stearns – banjo
Atsuko Sato – bassoon
Kim Laskowski – bassoon
David Byrne – guest vocals, guitar (video)

Technical
Paul Fox – producer
Ed Thacker – engineer, mixing
Jay Vicari – engineer
Mike Scott – engineer
Chris Laidlaw – mixing assistant
Stephen Marcussen – mastering (audio)
Ebet Roberts – photography
Frank Olinsky – package design (audio)
Natalie Merchant – package design
Barbara Lambert – package design (video)
George Reisz – digital remastering (video)
Francis Milano – digital remastering (video)

For MTV
Alex Coletti – producer
Milton Lage – director
John Vesey – editor

Charts

Weekly charts

Year-end charts

References

External links
Lyrics

10,000 Maniacs video albums
1993 live albums
1993 video albums
Albums produced by Paul Fox (record producer)
Elektra Records live albums
Elektra Records video albums
Live video albums
MTV Unplugged albums
10,000 Maniacs live albums